The 1974–75 Yugoslav Ice Hockey League season was the 33rd season of the Yugoslav Ice Hockey League, the top level of ice hockey in Yugoslavia. 14 teams participated in the league, and Olimpija have won the championship.

Regular season

Group A1

Group A2

Group B

Group C

External links
Season on hrhockey

Yugoslav
Yugoslav Ice Hockey League seasons
1974–75 in Yugoslav ice hockey